Brooklyn, West Virginia may refer to:

Brooklyn, Fayette County, West Virginia, an unincorporated community
Brooklyn, Wetzel County, West Virginia, an unincorporated community

See also
Brooklin, West Virginia